The Rewanchal Express is a daily express train operated by West Central Railway's Bhopal division in India. The train's route runs between Bhopal Habibganj railway station of Bhopal in Madhya Pradesh and Rewa.

Arrival and departure info

The train No.12185 departs daily from Bhopal Habibganj at 22:00 hrs and reaches Rewa the next day at 08:00 hrs. On return, it departs from Rewa daily at 20:05 hrs and reaches Bhopal Habibganj at 06:05 hrs.

Coach composition
The train is a Super Fast Express which consist a total number of 22 coaches :
 2 AC 1/AC 2 COMPOSITE TIER
 1 AC 2 TIER
 3 AC 3 TIER
 13 SLEEPER CLASS
 2 GENERAL COACHES
 2 SLR COACHES
The coaches of the train are very neat and clean meeting up with all the world standards, hence it got an ISO CERTIFICATE by Indian Railways.

Route and halts
The train goes via Bina–Katni rail route. The main important halts on the way are start from Habibganj 22:00
 Habibganj
 BHOPAL JUNCTION
 Vidisha
 Ganj Basoda
 Mandi Bamora
 Bina Junction
 Khurai
 Saugor
 Patharia
 Damoh
 Katni murwara
 Maihar
 Unchhera
 Satna
 REWA

Events in line's history 
 There were two REWANCHAL EXPRESS (2185/2186 and 2187/2188).The 2185/2186 was running 4 days a week via.  Bina and 2187/2188,3 days a week via Itarsi. Later the train via. Itarsi was cancelled and replaced by Jabalpur-Indore Express. Also the train number, 2185/2186 via Bina was made daily.
 The train number 12187/12188 is still shared by Jabalpur–Mumbai Garibrath Express
 The train received an ISO 9001:2000 Certificate in 2001.

Express trains in India
Rail transport in Madhya Pradesh
Transport in Bhopal
Transport in Rewa, Madhya Pradesh
Named passenger trains of India